English singer Gary Barlow has released six studio albums, eighteen singles, twenty-two music videos and five featured songs. Barlow has had fifteen number-one UK singles (twelve with Take That and three solo), eleven number-one albums (eight with Take That and three solo) and has written thirteen UK number-one singles (10 with Take That, two solo and one as co-writer of Robbie Williams' "Candy"), selling over 50 million records worldwide and over seven million concert tickets.

After Take That split up in 1996 Gary Barlow signed with RCA Records and began to write his first solo material since the band had formed. Prior to Take That forming Barlow had been writing and performing songs across the North of England until he was spotted by Nigel Martin-Smith. He identified Barlow as the foundation to which he could build a new boyband around, using Barlow's voice and songwriting ability to catapult Take That to fame and superstardom. As Barlow began to become recognised throughout the music industry as the songwriting talent behind Take That a number of musicians took notice, with Elton John asking Barlow to provide backing vocals to his hit single "Can You Feel the Love Tonight".

In July 1996, Barlow released his first single as a solo artist, entitled "Forever Love". The single proved a critical and commercial success becoming Barlow's first solo number 1 in the UK, selling over 400,000 copies and being certified as Gold by the BPI. The single remained in the top 75 of the UK charts for 16 weeks whilst also charting in the top 10 of twelve countries across Europe. The second single was announced as "Love Won't Wait", written by Madonna and Shep Pettibone. The single was released in April 1997 and became Barlow's second number 1 hit in the UK, becoming certified as Silver by the BPI and also charting in eleven countries worldwide. Barlow's debut album Open Road was released in May 1997. It went straight to number 1 in the UK and charted across Europe. The album was later certified as Platinum by the BPI and has sold 2 million copies worldwide to date. The third single from the album was "So Help Me Girl", which was released in Europe in July and was Barlow's first release in the US. The single peaked at number 3 on the Billboard Contemporary, number 1 on the Billboard R&R and peaked at number 44 on the Billboard Hot 100. The single also peaked at number 11 in the UK and charted respectfully inside Europe. The final UK single from the album was "Open Road", which charted at number 7 in the UK, whilst the final single to be released in Germany, "Hang on in There Baby" peaked at 69.

After the success of his debut album, Barlow released his second album Twelve Months, Eleven Days in 1999. The album was preceded by the single "Stronger", however due to an unexpected media backlash towards Barlow and the taunting of him by bandmate Robbie Williams the single received minimal airplay and support and peaked at number 16 in the UK and number 11 in Finland. The second single "For All That You Want" was originally entitled Superhero" and charted in the US, but was rewritten for Barlow's second album. The single was also subjected to minimal airplay and support and charted at number 24 in the UK, and number 6 in Finland. The album followed and peaked at number 34 in the UK, which resulted in Barlow and his label parting ways as he instead began to work behind the scenes of the music industry and write for artists rather than perform himself.

Barlow's first solo release since 1999 was a duet with reconciled Take That bandmate Robbie Williams on a single entitled "Shame". The single was written by both Barlow and Williams after they began working together in Los Angeles on new material for Take That following Williams' return to the band. The single peaked at number 2 in the UK, being certified as Silver by the BPI and Gold by the FIMI, whilst also charting in 19 countries worldwide.

On June 2012, thirteen years after the release of his last solo album Twelve Months, Eleven Days, Gary Barlow released his third solo album Sing, which entered at number 1 in the UK with the single "Sing" also entering the charts at number 11. The following week Sing rose to number 1 in the UK Singles Chart selling 142,000 copies and becoming the highest selling single of 2012. The album of the same name remained at number 1 making Barlow the first artist in 2012 to have the number 1 album and number 1 single in the same week.

Albums

Studio albums

Compilation albums

Singles

As lead artist

As featured artist

Other charted songs

Videography

Albums

Television

Film

Music videos

Notes

References

Barlow, Gary
Discography